Miyonse Amosu (born August 26, 1992) is a Nigerian chef and media personality from Badagry in Lagos State, Nigeria. He is known for being a housemate in the Big Brother Naija season 2, and hosting the cooking segment of the Wake Up Nigeria breakfast show on TVC Entertainment.

Early life and education 
Born in Festac Town, Lagos State to an entrepreneur father and a mum who is a nurse, he is the last of four children with an elder sister as well as two elder brothers. He went through nursery and primary education at AT-BET International School in Lagos, Nigeria's most populous city.

He had his secondary education at Early Life Secondary School in Lagos, graduating in 2009, and proceeded to the University of Lagos where he bagged a  Bachelor of Science (B.sc) degree in Mass Communication in 2013. After leaving the University, he had a brief stint at the Lagos State Signage & Advertisement Agency (LASAA), before deciding to make a switch to the culinary profession.

Big Brother 
In 2017, he went in as one of an eventual 14 housemates on the second season of the popular reality show Big Brother Nigeria. In June 2017, he was announced as the maiden ambassador for Payporte Food store.

Awards and recognition 
He was awarded for his “remarkable contribution” to the entertainment industry during the City People's Awards which held in August 2017  and also won the award for Outstanding Television Chef of the Year at the Nigerian Culinary Professionals Awards for his work on Wake Up Nigeria.

References 

1992 births
Living people
Big Brother (franchise) contestants
People from Lagos
University of Lagos alumni
Nigerian media personalities
Residents of Lagos